The Mangadu Kamakshi Amman Temple is a famous pilgrim destination Hindu temple dedicated to goddess Parvathi, located in Mangadu, a suburb of Chennai, India. The term Mangadu means "Mango Forests or Mango Groves" and as the term implies this must have been a thickly wooded Mango groove in times of yore.

Legend 

Mangadu is known for the temple of "Tapas Kamakshi" or Goddess Kamakshi performing penance in Fire. This is the place where the goddess performed her penance to marry and re-unite with Lord Shiva.  All 32 types of Dharmic rituals were performed here by the goddess.

The background is that when Lord Shiva and Parvati where in Mount Kailash the Goddess playfully closed the eyes of the Lord Shiva and as a  result the whole universe fell into eternal darkness. So the Lord ordained her to  perform Tapasya.

The Goddess came down to this place and performed penance amidst "Panchagni" resting her left leg on the sacred fire and folding her right leg. She holds a "Japamala" or rosary in her hand as she meditated on Lord Shiva who asked her to come to Kanchipuram for marriage.

After the goddess left the place, the heat of the fire that she had created caused great discomfort and became unbearable for all living beings there. During his pilgrim tours, Sage Adi Shankaracharya visited Mangadu and installed a Sri Ardhameru Chakram at this place to calm down the heat of the fire created by the Goddess and at the same time make it into a place that is soothing for all living beings.

We can even today see the "Chakra" in the sanctum sanctorum of the temple and poojas are performed regularly to this Chakra. 
This Chakra is considered to be a Tantric form of the Goddess herself and hence Mangadu also finds a unique place amongst worshippers of the Tantric sect as well. An abhishekam being performed to this Ardhameru Chakram (அர்த்த மேரு சக்கரம்) on every Vijaya Dashami day (every year).

Temple architecture 

The temple sports the Chola style of Architecture and construction. The Raja Gopuram was a recent addition to the Temple. The Raja Gopuram or the Main entrance faces South and is 7 tiered with great sculptures on it, But the east entrance is still used by many devotees as there is a market along the road leading to the east gate. People buy the flowers, Lemons and other pooja items as they walk through the market into the Temple.

As we enter the Temple, we find the Ganapati Shrine to the left of the main entrance. We pay our respects and as we walk further enter the Main Hall of the Temple. We straight proceed to the Sanctum where we can see the " Ardha Meru Maha Yantra " and an idol of Goddess Kamakshi in the Main Shrine. The Ardhameru Sri Chakram is the chief divinity in this temple. Only Kumkuma archana is performed and no abhishekam is done for Sri Chakram, as it is made up of herbs.

After this we proceed to walk back, we came across the Shrine of "Tapas Kamakshi" - This was installed at the behest of Kanchi Paramacharya. We can also see the various other deities like Lord Surya etc., in the outer courtyard. As we circumbulate the Temple, we can see Sapta Matrikas installed right behind in the Main outer courtyard and walk through to the Dwajastambha installed in the Eastern side. This completes the visit to the Temple. People come here to pray for Marriage, child-birth, promotions, purchasing new house, and other numerous needs.

After the visit to the Kamakshi Temple, people must proceed to the Vaikunta Perumal Shrine or the Shrine of Lord Vishnu which is about 500 meters away to complete the Visit/pilgrimage. Here Lord Vishnu can be seen in a seated posture along with his 2 consorts Sridevi and Bhoodevi holding a ring in his palm that he has brought for the marriage of his sister Kamakshi. This is a small temple with separate shrines for Goddess Lakshmi, Sri Andal and Lord Hanuman.

Administration
The temple is administered by the Hindu Religious and Charitable Endowments Department of the Government of Tamil Nadu.

The current Dharmakartha (inherited) of the temple is Dr.Manali R.Srinivasan MDS.  He actively involves into various development programs.
Kamakshi Amman temple trust manages 6 more temples (famous and infamous) in the locality including Sri Vaikunta Perumal Temple, Velleeswarar Temple, Sri Maanthiyamman Temple, Vinayagar Temple, Gangai Aamman temple, etc.

References

External links
 Website of the temple

Hindu temples in Chennai
Hindu temples in Kanchipuram district